Chalcopasta territans is a moth in the family Noctuidae (the owlet moths) first described by Henry Edwards in 1884. It is found in North America.

The MONA or Hodges number for Chalcopasta territans is 9775.

References

Further reading

External links
 

Amphipyrinae
Articles created by Qbugbot
Moths described in 1884